Dennis Bailey (born 24 September 1935) is an English former footballer who played as a forward. Though a player in the Football League for eight years between 1953 and 1961, he featured just once each for Bolton Wanderers and Port Vale.

Career
Bailey played for Bolton Wanderers from 1953 to 1958, but only made the one First Division appearance for Bill Ridding's "Trotters". He signed with Norman Low's Port Vale in August 1958. His only game in his three years at Vale Park was at outside-left in a 2–0 win over Shrewsbury Town on 22 November 1958; the "Valiants" went on to win the Fourth Division title in 1958–59. He left on a free transfer in May 1961.

Career statistics
Source:

Honours
Port Vale
Football League Fourth Division: 1958–59

References

1935 births
Living people
People from Biddulph
English footballers
Association football forwards
Bolton Wanderers F.C. players
Port Vale F.C. players
English Football League players